Roberto Baldassari (born 31 December 1972) is a retired Swiss football midfielder.

References

1972 births
Living people
Swiss men's footballers
FC Wettingen players
FC Zürich players
FC Aarau players
Association football midfielders
Swiss Super League players